Tetramethyl bisphenol F (TMBPF) is a new coating intended as a safer replacement for bisphenol A and bisphenol F to use in epoxy linings of aluminium cans and steel cans. It was previously suggested as an insulator in electronic circuit boards.

Polymerisation of tetramethyl bisphenol F occurs with epichlorohydrin when heated between 40 and 70 °C using an alkali as a catalyst to form the resin used as a coating.

Health and Environmental Effects

Causes serious eye irritation. May cause respiratory and skin irritation. Very toxic to aquatic life.

Human Endocrine Effects

According to tests TMBPF does not have any effect on the endocrine system; it does not leach out of cans because unlike BPA it is fully polymerized when deposited on the metal, so there is no free chemical to leach out. Tetramethyl bisphenol F was tested on rats to see if there were effects like male or female hormones. It had almost no effects like this. However, a different study did find effects.

References

Commodity chemicals

Coatings
Plasticizers